The Conway County Library is the public library system of Conway County, Arkansas.  The main library is located at 101 West Church Street in downtown Morrilton, Arkansas, the county seat.  The library is located in a Classical Revival brick building designed by Thomas Harding and funded in part by a grant from Andrew Carnegie.  In 1916 the Pathfinder Club of Morrilton applied for the grant.  A lot was purchased, and Morrilton Mayor J. A. Frisby, Night Rainwater, and W. M. Riddick worked with a committee to construct the new library.  The construction cost was $7,500, leaving $2,500 to purchase coal and furniture for the building.  The building was completed in October 1916 and still serves as the Conway County Library.  The building was listed on the National Register of Historic Places in 1978.  The library organization began as a private collection in 1894, and was housed in private residences and vacant commercial buildings prior to the construction of this building.

See also
National Register of Historic Places listings in Conway County, Arkansas
List of Carnegie libraries in Arkansas

References

External links
Conway County Library web site

Libraries on the National Register of Historic Places in Arkansas
Library buildings completed in 1916
Buildings and structures in Conway County, Arkansas
Carnegie libraries in Arkansas
Buildings and structures in Morrilton, Arkansas
Individually listed contributing properties to historic districts on the National Register in Arkansas
National Register of Historic Places in Conway County, Arkansas
1894 establishments in Arkansas